Arab is a city in Marshall and Cullman counties in the northern part of the U.S. state of Alabama, located  from Guntersville Lake and Guntersville Dam, and is included in the Huntsville-Decatur Combined Statistical Area. As of the 2020 census, the population of the city was 8,461.

History
What is now Arab was established by Stephen Tuttle Thompson in the 1840s, and was originally known as "Thompson's Village". The current name of the town was an unintentional misspelling by the U.S. Postal Service in 1882 of the city's intended name, taken from Arad Thompson, the son of the town founder, who had applied for a post office that year. "Arad" was one of three names sent to the Postal Service for consideration, the others being "Ink" and "Bird." Arab has frequently been noted on lists of unusual place names.

Arab was incorporated in 1892.

Arab's motto is "Proud of our past... and embracing our future".  The people that settled the Arab area were people of Faith, and early on, they established churches. In 1860 Hiram
Brashier organized Brashier’s Chapel Methodist Church, which would later burn and be rebuilt by the congregation in 1899 on a different site. In1882 both the Rocky Mount and Gilliam Springs Baptist Churches were organized. These communities at that time were not a part of Arab. It was the Northern Methodists that are given credit for building the first church in Arab in 1883, a log building, which was used for both church and school. It was 1890 before a frame building was constructed just for school purposes. Union Captain James Walter Elliott, who had been the town’s first school teacher, donated the land. In 1893 the Southern Methodist built on First Avenue with a Masonic Lodge on the second floor and the Northern Methodist moved south of town to Union Hill. In 1912 the First Baptist
Church of Arab was organized. 

Arab was one of the towns reaching contact with the 2011 Super Outbreak of tornado activity.

Geography
The city is primarily in southern Marshall County; a small portion extends south into Cullman County. U.S. Route 231 runs north-to-south through Arab, and State Route 69 runs east-to-west, through the city's business district. US 231 leads north  to Huntsville and south  to Oneonta, while SR 69 leads east  to Guntersville and southwest  to Cullman.

The city lies on the Tennessee Valley Divide, with the north side draining either west to Cotaco Creek or east to Shoal Creek, both tributaries of the Tennessee River, while the south half of the city drains to the headwaters of the Mulberry Fork of the Black Warrior River, part of the Tombigbee River watershed.

Demographics

City of Arab

Arab was incorporated as a town in 1892, but it did not first report a population on the census until the 1920 U.S. Census.

2000 census data
At the 2000 census there were 7,174 people in 3,012 households, including 2,075 families, in the city. The racial makeup of the city was 98.29% White, 0.18% Black or African American, 0.49% Native American, 0.39% Asian, 0.17% from other races, and 0.49% from two or more races. 0.66% were Hispanic or Latino of any race.

Of the 3,012 households 31.2% had children under the age of 18 living with them, 54.3% were married couples living together, 11.3% had a female householder with no husband present, and 31.1% were non-families. 28.2% of households were one person and 13.7% were one person aged 65 or older. The average household size was 2.35 and the average family size was 2.87.

The age distribution was 23.9% under the age of 18, 7.2% from 18 to 24, 27.6% from 25 to 44, 23.6% from 45 to 64, and 17.8% 65 or older. The median age was 40 years. For every 100 females, there were 87.2 males. For every 100 females age 18 and over, there were 82.8 males.

The median household income was $36,716 and the median family income  was $45,761. Males had a median income of $32,425 versus $24,265 for females. The per capita income for the city was $20,035. About 8.2% of families and 10.0% of the population were below the poverty line, including 12.5% of those under age 18 and 14.9% of those age 65 or over.

2010 census
At the 2010 census there were 8,050 people in 3,359 households, including 2,257 families, in the city. The racial makeup of the city was 96.6% White, 0.1% Black or African American, 0.6% Native American, 0.7% Asian, 0.7% from other races, and 1.1% from two or more races. 1.7%. were Hispanic or Latino of any race.

Of the 3,359 households 28.9% had children under the age of 18 living with them, 50.4% were married couples living together, 13.0% had a female householder with no husband present, and 32.8% were non-families. 29.6% of households were one person and 14.9% were one person aged 65 or older. The average household size was 2.37 and the average family size was 2.92.

The age distribution was 23.7% under the age of 18, 8.3% from 18 to 24, 22.0% from 25 to 44, 27.0% from 45 to 64, and 19.1% 65 or older. The median age was 42.2 years. For every 100 females, there were 88.6 males. For every 100 females age 18 and over, there were 91.4 males.

The median household income was $42,435 and the median family income  was $64,432. Males had a median income of $44,401 versus $40,062 for females. The per capita income for the city was $23,986. About 13.3% of families and 18.1% of the population were below the poverty line, including 27.7% of those under age 18 and 14.8% of those age 65 or over.

2020 census

As of the 2020 United States census, there were 8,461 people, 3,177 households, and 2,094 families residing in the city.

Arab Precinct/Division (1920-)

Arab Precinct (Marshall County 26th Precinct) first appeared on the 1920 U.S. Census. In 1960, it was changed to the Arab Census Division as part of a general reorganization of counties. The census division only includes the Marshall County portion of the town of Arab. The Cullman County portion is in the Baileyton-Joppa Census Division.

Government
Arab has a mayor-council form of city government consisting of five council members and a mayor. City elections occur every four years, coinciding with the presidential elections. Council seats are at-large and are not associated with districts. Arab City Schools is the public school district. Arab has its own paid police department. Their fire department has one station, sitting on top of Marshall County 911 center. Both are paid departments.

Infrastructure

Utilities
Electricity service in Arab is provided through Arab Electric Cooperative, which buys power through the Tennessee Valley Authority. Water service in Arab is provided through Arab Water Works, which gets water from Browns Creek in Guntersville Lake. Natural gas is also provided in Arab, through Marshall County Gas District, which is based out of Guntersville.

Transportation
 U.S. Highway 231
 Alabama State Route 69

Notable people
 Liles C. Burke, judge in the United States District Court for the Northern District of Alabama
Vernon Derrick, fiddle and mandolin player
Fred Nall Hollis, artist
Jill King, singer/songwriter
Jack Lively, Major League Baseball pitcher
Wayne Mills, country music singer

References

External links

Arab Chamber of Commerce
History of Arab

Cities in Alabama
Cities in Cullman County, Alabama
Cities in Marshall County, Alabama
Huntsville-Decatur, AL Combined Statistical Area
Populated places established in the 1840s
1882 establishments in the United States
Sundown towns in Alabama